Maha Naji Salah is a Yemeni writer and social activist. She was born in Sanaa in 1978 and studied at the University of Sanaa where she was involved in student journalism. She started writing and publishing short stories in 1996. She has since gone on to found an NGO called the Ebhar Foundation for Childhood and Creativeness.

References

Yemeni women writers
Living people
Sanaa University alumni
20th-century Yemeni writers
20th-century Yemeni women writers
21st-century Yemeni writers
21st-century Yemeni women writers
Year of birth missing (living people)